Andy Joseph Pelmard (born 12 March 2000) is a French professional footballer who plays as a left-back for Swiss Super League club Basel.

Club career
Pelmard made his professional debut with Nice in a 1–0 Ligue 1 loss to Amiens SC on 23 February 2019.

On 1 July 2021 Pelmard joined Basel's first team for their 2021–22 season under head coach Patrick Rahmen on a one year loan. Pelmard played his debut for his new club in the second qualifying round of the 2021–22 UEFA Europa Conference League, a home game in the St. Jakob-Park on 22 July 2021 as Basel won 3–0 against Partizani Tirana. On 4 February 2022, Basel exercised the purchase option in their loan contract and signed Pelmard on a definite basis with a three and a half year contract until the summer of 2025.

International career
Pelmard is a youth international for France, having represented the France U17s at the 2017 U17 Euros and the 2017 FIFA U-17 World Cup.

Personal life
Pelmard is of Guadeloupean descent and Malagasy descent through his mother.

References

External links
OGC Nice Profile

2000 births
Footballers from Nice
French people of Guadeloupean descent
French sportspeople of Malagasy descent
Black French sportspeople
Living people
French footballers
France youth international footballers
France under-21 international footballers
Association football defenders
OGC Nice players
FC Basel players
Ligue 2 players
Swiss Super League players
French expatriate footballers
Expatriate footballers in Switzerland
French expatriate sportspeople in Switzerland